Louis the Blind ( 880 – 5 June 928) was the king of Provence from 11 January 887, King of Italy from 12 October 900, and briefly Holy Roman Emperor, as Louis III, between 901 and 905. His father was a Bosonid and his mother was a Carolingian. He was blinded after a failed invasion of Italy in 905.

Early reign
Born c.880, Louis was the son of Boso, the usurper king of Provence, and Ermengard, a daughter of Emperor Louis II. As a boy of seven, Louis succeeded to the throne of his father Boso as King of Provence upon Boso's death on 11 January 887. The kingdom Louis inherited was much smaller than his father's, as it did not include Upper Burgundy (lost to Rudolph I of Burgundy), nor any of French Burgundy, absorbed by Richard the Justiciar, Duke of Burgundy.  This meant that the kingdom of Provence was restricted to the environs of Vienne. The Provençal barons elected Ermengard to act as his regent, with the support of Louis's uncle, Richard the Justiciar.

In May, Ermengard traveled with Louis to the court of her relative, the emperor Charles the Fat, and received his recognition of the young Louis as king. Charles adopted Louis as his son and put both mother and son under his protection.  In May 889, she traveled to the court of Charles' successor, Arnulf, to make a new submission, while at the same time seeking the blessing of Pope Stephen V. The short work, Visio Karoli Grossi, may have been written shortly after Charles' death to support Louis's claim. If so, Louis must have had the support of Fulk the Venerable, Archbishop of Reims. On the other hand, the Visio may have been written later, circa 901, to celebrate (and support) Louis's imperial coronation.

In August 890, at the Diet of Valence, a council of bishops and feudatories of the realm, after hearing the recommendation of the pope, and receiving notification of Charles the Fat's previous agreement to the proposition, proclaimed Louis as King of Arles, Provence, and Cisjurane Burgundy.  In 894, Louis himself did homage to Arnulf.

In 896, Louis waged war on the Saracens. Throughout his reign he fought with these Saracen pirates, who had established a base at Fraxinet in 889 and had been raiding the coast of Provence, alarming the local nobility.

Conflict with Berengar
In 900, Louis, as the grandson and heir of the Emperor Louis II, was invited into Italy by various lords, including Adalbert II, Margrave of Tuscany, who were suffering under the ravages of the Magyars and the incompetent rule of Berengar I.  Louis thus marched his army across the Alps and defeated Berengar, chasing him from Pavia, the old Lombard capital, where, in the church of San Michele, he was crowned with the Iron Crown of Lombardy on 12 October, 900.  He travelled onwards to Rome, where, in 901, he was crowned Emperor by Pope Benedict IV.  However, his inability to stem the Magyar incursions and impose any meaningful control over northern Italy saw the Italian nobles quickly abandon his cause and once again align themselves with Berengar.  In 902, Berengar defeated Louis's armies and forced him to flee to Provence and promise never to return.

In 905, Louis, after again listening to the Italian nobles who were tired of Berengar's rule, this time led by Adalbert I of Ivrea, launched another attempt to invade Italy.  Once again throwing Berengar out of Pavia, he marched and also succeeded in taking Verona with only a small following, after receiving the promise of support from the bishop, Adalard. Partisans of Berengar in the town soon got word to Berengar of Louis's exposed position at Verona, and his limited support. Berengar returned, accompanied by Bavarian troops, and entered Verona in the dead of night. Louis sought sanctuary at the church of St Peter, but he was captured, and on 21 July 905, he had his eyes put out (for breaking his oath) and was forced to relinquish his royal Italian and imperial crowns. Later, Berengar became Emperor. After this last attempt to restore Carolingian power over Italy, Louis continued to rule Provence for over twenty years, though his cousin Hugh, Count of Arles, was the dominant figure in the territory.

Louis returned to Vienne, his capital, and by 911, he had put most of the royal powers in the hands of Hugh. Hugh was made Margrave of Provence and Marquis of Vienne and moved the capital to Arles. As regent, Hugh married Louis's sister Willa. Louis lived out his days until his death in obscurity, and through his life he continued to style himself as Roman Emperor.  He was succeeded by his brother-in-law in 928.

Marriages and heirs
In 899, Louis III was betrothed to Anna of Constantinople, the daughter of Byzantine Emperor Leo VI the Wise and his second wife, Zoe Zaoutzaina.  The evidence for this is a letter by Patriarch Nicholas Mystikos in which he testifies that Leo VI had united his daughter to a Frank prince, a cousin of Bertha, to whom came later a great misfortune.<ref>The third marriage, I have said to the Emperor, was already unworthy of your majesty, but there was an excuse with the agreement that you had concluded with the Frank. Since it was conveined that you destined him as his spouse your only daughter. It was the cousin of Berta, to whom had arrived the misfortune that is known.</ref>  That unfortunate prince could only be Louis III, whose mother Irmingardis was a first cousin of Bertha and who was blinded on 21 July 905.  This betrothal occurred shortly before the fall of Taormina to the Arabs, and was part of extended diplomatic activities meant to strengthen Byzantine alliances with the western powers to preserve Byzantine territory in southern Italy.

The question of whether the betrothal was ever followed up by an actual marriage is still a matter of some controversy.  Louis fathered a son called Charles-Constantine, who would become Count of Vienne. Charles' mother is not named in any sources. There has been modern speculation, proposed by Previté-Orton and championed by Christian Settipani, that she was Anna,C. W. Previté Orton, "Charles Constantine of Vienne", English Historical Review, 29(1914):703—9. the daughter of Leo VI and Zoe Zaoutzaina, based both upon the documented betrothal, as well on the onomastic evidence, stating that Charles-Constantine's name points to a Byzantine mother. Shaun Tougher doubts they were ever married.

Detractors of the theory point out that when Anna was born, however, she was the daughter of a concubine who later became empress. Her father, at the time of Charles' birth, was the reigning emperor, therefore the silence of primary sources works against this theory. In addition, Liutprand of Cremona makes no mention of this, and it would have been very interesting to him, given that he was a thorough gossip, had been ambassador to Constantinople and devoted several chapters to the misadventures of Louis in Italy with no mention of these Byzantine connections. René Poupardin believed that Constantine was not a baptismal name, but Settipani disagrees. Richer specifically stated that Charles' ancestry was tainted with illegitimacy and mentioned nothing of his mother's supposed illustrious Byzantine parentage.

Christian Settipani challenges that theory by stating that the only reason why René Poupardin made him a bastard of Louis III was a passage by Richerius claiming that "Charles Constantine (...) was from a royal race, but which nobility had been vilified by a bastard ancestry remounting to his great-great-grandfather", proving nothing about Charles-Constantine's mother. Such a union would also account for the mention of Greek merchants in Louis’ privilege of 921.

In 914, Louis entered a second union, which would then be either his first or second marriage, by marrying Adelaide, daughter of Rudolph I of Upper Burgundy, likely mother of Rudolph, the other documented son of Louis the Blind.

In December 915, his daughter, Anna of Provence, married Berengar. It has been suggested, largely for onomastic reasons, that Anna was a daughter of Louis III and his wife Anna, daughter of Leo VI the Wise. In that case, she would have been betrothed to Berengar while still a child and only become his consors and imperatrix in 923.

Notes

References

 Duckett, Eleanor (1968). Death and Life in the Tenth Century. Ann Arbor: University of Michigan Press.
 Previté-Orton, C. W. "Italy and Provence, 900–950." The English Historical Review'', Vol. 32, No. 127. (Jul., 1917), pp 335–347.
 
 

880s births
928 deaths
Year of birth uncertain
10th-century Holy Roman Emperors
9th-century kings of Italy
10th-century kings of Italy
Bosonids
Frankish warriors
Blind royalty and nobility
Medieval child monarchs
Kings of Lower Burgundy
Monarchs of the Carolingian Empire